The 2017 Team Speedway Junior World Championship was the 13th FIM Team Under-21 World Championship season. The final took place on 2 September, 2017 in Rybnik, Poland.

Hosts Poland won their tenth Team Under-21 World Championship, and their fourth in succession. The Poles accumulated 47 points, with Bartosz Smektała top scoring for them with 14 points. Australia finished second with 37 points, with Denmark in third on 27.

Semi-finals

Final 

  Rybnik
 2 September 2017

Scores

See also 
 2017 Speedway World Cup
 2017 Individual Speedway Junior World Championship

References 

2016
World Team Junior